Malaysia started sending athletes to the Southeast Asian Games in 1959 as a Founding member of the Southeast Asian Games Federation (SEAGF) alongside Burma (now Myanmar), Kampuchea (now Cambodia), Laos, Thailand, and the Republic of Vietnam (South Vietnam). Later, Malaysia tendered a suggestion to expand the Southeast Asian Peninsula (SEAP) Games Federation by inviting other Southeast Asian countries such as Brunei, Indonesia, and the Philippines. These three new members were officially welcomed into the Federation on 5 February 1977. The 1977 Southeast Asian Games in Kuala Lumpur becomes the first games that bear the title Southeast Asian Games.

Medals by Games 
*Red border color indicates tournament was held on home soil.

Medals by sport

Medals by individual

References

Malaysia at the Southeast Asian Games